The 1999 Men's NORCECA Volleyball Championship was the 16th edition of the tournament, played from 7 to 12 September in Monterrey, Mexico. The top 2 teams qualified for the 1999 FIVB World Cup.

Competing nations
The following national teams have qualified:

Squads

Pool standing procedure
 Number of matches won
 Match points
 Points ratio
 Sets ratio
 Result of the last match between the tied teams

Match won 3–0: 5 match points for the winner, 0 match points for the loser
Match won 3–1: 4 match points for the winner, 1 match point for the loser
Match won 3–2: 3 match points for the winner, 2 match points for the loser

Preliminary round

Pool A

Pool B

Final round

7th place match

Quarterfinals

5th place match

Semifinals

Bronze medal match

Final

Final standing

References

External links

Men's NORCECA Volleyball Championship
NORCECA
1999 in Mexican sports
International volleyball competitions hosted by Mexico
Sport in Monterrey
20th century in Monterrey